John J. Francis may refer to:

 J. J. Francis (1839–1901), counsel in the British Colony of Hong Kong 
 John J. Francis (New Jersey judge) (1903–1984), American politician and jurist